Dera Taj railway station (Urdu and ) is located in Dera Taj village, Khanewal district of Punjab province, Pakistan. The station is named after the famous contractor and builder, Mian Taj Muhammad.

See also
 List of railway stations in Pakistan
 Pakistan Railways

References

External links

Railway stations in Khanewal District
Railway stations on Karachi–Peshawar Line (ML 1)